The Museum of Berkshire Aviation is a small aviation museum in Woodley, a suburb of Reading in Berkshire, England. The museum is on the edge of the site of the former Woodley Aerodrome and many of its exhibits relate to the Phillips & Powis company, later renamed Miles Aircraft, which was based there from 1932 to 1947. Other aircraft exhibited were built by Handley Page (Reading) Ltd, and by Fairey Aviation at White Waltham near Maidenhead.

Despite being a small museum, several of the exhibits are unique survivors. These include a Miles Martinet (a World War II target tug), the only Miles Student two-seat side-by-side jet trainer ever built, and a Fairey Jet Gyrodyne — a composite helicopter and autogyro, or gyrodyne.

Other exhibits include:
 A Fairey Gannet carrier-borne anti-submarine aircraft, formerly operated by the Royal Navy.
 A Handley Page Herald turboprop airliner, designed by Miles and built at Woodley after Handley Page took over Miles' aircraft contracts.
 A Miles Magister two-seat basic trainer aircraft.

External links 
 
 Unofficial guide to the Museum of Berkshire Aviation
 

Aerospace museums in England
Museums in Berkshire
Borough of Wokingham